Jerry Ross may refer to:

 Jerry Ross (painter) (born 1944), Gerald, American painter
 Jerry Ross (composer) (1926–1955), Jerold, American lyricist and composer
 Jerry L. Ross (born 1948), U.S. Air Force officer and former NASA astronaut 
 Jerry Ross (record producer) (1933–2017), American songwriter and producer, founder of Heritage Records

See also
Gerald Ross (disambiguation)
Gerard Ross (disambiguation)